Eugène Ketterer (7 July 1831 – 18 December 1870) was a prolific French composer and pianist who was known for his numerous salon arrangements of contemporary opera arias.

Career
Born in Rouen, France, of an originally Alsatian family, Ketterer became a student at the Paris Conservatoire in his early youth, where he studied with Antoine François Marmontel. He won second prize for solfège in 1847 and a premier accessit in 1852. After his graduation until his death in Paris in 1870, he appeared constantly as a pianist winning wide repute for his fantasies and drawing-room pieces, of which he wrote a large number, but only a few of which are still in the repertoire.

The list of Ketterer's works gives an excellent overview on the world of opera in France at the time, as many of these works are transcriptions of popular opera arias, many still famous today.

Many of Ketterer's transcriptions were subsequently arranged for piano 4-hands by other arrangers like Joseph Rummel (1818–1880) or Édouard Mangin. "Les Étoiles" is a collection of 18 (later 19) such arrangements (1875).

Evaluation

Hervé Lacombe classifies Ketterer among the authors of what he calls derivative products, referring to all the scores of varying degrees of quality drawn (by other composers) from fashionable operas and which "testify to uses proper to the 19th century and to the extraordinary hold operas had on the French musical world" (page 1034). For Lacombe, Ketterer "mass-produced pieces used to shine in salons and concert halls and provide the consumer with nice airs skilfully arranged" (page 1045). He adds further below, about his fantasia on L'Africaine, that "Ketterer selects the most conventional elements of Meyerbeer's score ... and treats them conventionally.".

Compositions

Piano works
Op. 5 - L'Entrée au tournoi
Op. 7 - Grand Caprice Hongrois (4-hands)
Op. 10 - Une Promenade dans la mer
Op. 16 - Souvenirs de 'La Promise', opéra de Louis Clapisson, Grande fantaisie brillante
Op. 20 - Fantaisie sur 'Les Sabots de la Marquise', opéra de E. Boulanger
Op. 21 - L'Argentine, Fantaisie-mazurka
Op. 22 - Le Chant du Colibri, de l'opéra Jaguarita de F. Halévy, Caprice
Op. 24 - Grand galop de concert
Op. 31 - Fandango de l'opéra 'Les Lavandières de Santarem' de Gevaert
Op. 33 - Fantaisie brillante sur Manon Lescaut, opéra de D. F. E. Auber
Op. 35 - Ballade
Op. 39 - Nocturne
Op. 43 - Les Concerts du bocage, Caprice de genre
Op. 45 - Fantaisie de concert pour le piano sur Oberon de Weber
Op. 48 - Dalila, Grande valse brillante
Op. 56 - Chanson créole
Op. 57 - Élégie (à la mémoire de Frédéric Chopin)
Op. 60 - Fantaisie brillante sur Martha, de Flotow
Op. 61 - Marche écossaise sur Quentin Durward, Musique de Gevaert
Op. 66 - Oh! Dites lui, romance favorite de Tamberlick, musique de Mme La Princesse L. Kotschoubey
Op. 68 - Le Pardon de Ploërmel, de Meyerbeer, fantaisie transcription
Op. 69 - Polka-mazurka sur 'Faust', opéra de Ch. Gounod
Op. 70 - Herculanum, de Félicien David, fantaisie brillante
Op. 72 - Le Réveil des sylphes, Fantaisie
Op. 77 - Fleur de Bruyère, Morceau de salon
Op. 79 - Fantaisie brillante sur Diane de Solange, opéra en 5 actes de S. A. R. Ernest II duc régnant de Saxe-Cobourg et Gotha
Op. 82 - Mosaïque sur Don Juan, de Mozart
Op. 83 - Philémon et Baucis, opéra de Ch. Gounod, Morceau de salon 
Op. 84 - Fantaisie-transcription sur 'Le Roman d'Elvire', opéra-comique d'Ambroise Thomas
Op. 88 - Mazurka des patineurs. Souvenir du Nord
Op. 89 - Mélodie allemande (Die Thräne), Morceau de salon
Op. 90 - La Châtelaine
Op. 94 - Sérénade complainte de Gil Blas, opéra de 
Op. 95 - Fantaisie brillante sur 'La Circassienne', opéra d’Auber 
Op. 96 - Fantaisie-transcription sur 'Les Pêcheurs de Catane', d'A. Maillart
Op. 97 - Il Bacio (d'Arditi), Valse de salon
Op. 99 - Papillons et fleurs, Caprice
Op. 101 - Gaëtana, Mazurka
Op. 106 - La Stella (L'Étoile), 2me valse d'Arditi
Op. 107 - Fantaisie-transcription sur Rienzi, opéra de R. Wagner 
Op. 109 - Romance du voile sur 'Les Recruteurs', de Lefébure-Wély
Op. 110 - La Chatte merveilleuse, d'Albert Grisar, Fantaisie brillante
Op. 111 - Lalla Roukh, Fantaisie-rêverie
Op. 112 - Fantaisie sur 'Zémire et Azor', opéra de Grétry
Op. 113 - La Servante maîtresse, opéra comique de Pergolèse, Fantaisie
Op. 114 - La sonnambula, opéra de Bellini, Fantaisie de concert
Op. 115 - Illustrations sur Il trovatore, opéra de Verdi
Op. 116 - Valse des fleurs, Fantaisie de salon
Op. 117 - Le Réveil des pâtres, Morceau de salon
Op. 118 - Caprice militaire
Op. 120 - La Perle du soir
Op. 121 - Boute-en-train, Galop de concert
Op. 122 - Transcription brillante sur 'Ah! quel plaisir d'être soldat', de La Dame blanche, de Boïeldieu
Op. 124 - Les Échos d'Espagne. Mosaïque sur les Chansons d'Yradier 
Op. 125 - La Tradita', Romance d'ArditiOp. 126 - Fantaisie brillante sur Cosi fan tutte, opéra de MozartOp. 127 - La forza del destino, fantaisie-transcription 
Op. 128 - Fantaisie brillante sur Faust, de Gounod 
Op. 129 - Fantaisie brillante sur 'La Reine de Saba', opéra de Gounod 
Op. 130 - Voici le soleil. Valse chantée d'A. Mutel, transcriteOp. 131 - La Mule de Pédro, opéra de Victor Massé, Fantaisie-transcription
Op. 133 - Divertissement élégant sur Giselle, ballet d'Adolphe AdamOp. 134 - Les Vêpres siciliennes, Fantaisie-transcription
Op. 135 - Rêve d'enfant, mélodie, paroles de Victor Hugo, musique d'Adolphe Nibelle (transcription)
Op. 136 - Illustrations de Zampa, d'HéroldOp. 137 - Fantaisie brillante sur Les Troyens à Carthage, opéra d'Hector BerliozOp. 139 - Le Chant du Bivouac, de Kücken, transcription militaireOp. 141 - Marche StyrienneOp. 142 - Prière de Moïse, de Rossini, variéeOp. 143 - Valse des dominos. Grande valse de salon arrangée sur des motifs de CaussinusOp. 145 - Fantaisie-transcription sur Rigoletto, opéra de Verdi 
Op. 146 - À Grenade, Ariette espagnole, de RossiniOp. 147 - Les Amours du diable (opéra d'Albert Grisar), Fantaisie 
Op. 148 - Lara, opéra-comique de A. Maillart, Chanson arabe (À l'ombre des verts platanes), transcription variée (also, version for piano 4-hands by Édouard Mangin) 
Op. 149 - Mireille, opéra en cinq actes de Ch. Gounod, Fantaisie-transcription
Op. 150 - Souvenirs mélodiques on Norma, opéra de Bellini, Fantaisie
Op. 151 - Souvenirs mélodiques Les Puritains, fantaisie sur l'opéra de BelliniOp. 152 - Souvenirs mélodiques sur Le Barbier de Séville, opéra de Rossini, Fantaisie 
Op. 153 - Souvenirs mélodiques sur l’opéra Betly, de Donizetti, Fantaisie
Op. 154 - La Traviata, opéra de Verdi, Fantaisie-transcription
Op. 155 - Les Chevaliers d'Avenel, ballade écossaise
Op. 156 - Valse des rosesOp. 157 - Macbeth, Opéra de Verdi, Fantaisie-transcription
Op. 161 - Nuit d'Orient, Rêverie
Op. 162 - Noël, chant religieux de Ferdinand LavainneOp. 163 - Les Absents, opéra de Poise. Fantaisie 
Op. 164 - La flûte enchantée, Fantaisie 
Op. 166 - Le Capitaine Henriot, fantaisie brillante pour pianoOp. 167 - Le Saphir, opéra de Félicien David, Fantaisie
Op. 168 - Valse fantastique sur 'MacBeth
Op. 169 - Crispino e la Comare, opéra-bouffe des Frères Ricci, Fantaisie élégante
Op. 170 - Fantaisie de salon sur 'L'Africaine' de Meyerbeer
(with Auguste Durand) Op. 171 - Faust, opéra en 5 actes de Ch. Gounod (4-hands)
Op. 173 - L'Âme de la Pologne, cantique de Giovanni Duca, Transcription brillante
Op. 176 - Deux Transcriptions de salon de l'opéra de Mermet, 'Roland à Roncevaux': Mon coeur se brise (Trio.) et Superbes Pyrénées (Final)
Op. 177 - Chant du Lido
Op. 178 - Canzonetta
Op. 179 - Les Folies, Allegro-galop
Op. 180 - Souvenir de Florence. Romance de (Rodolfo) Mattiozzi (Quand tu m’aimais), variée
Op. 181 - Mabel. Valse de Godfrey, Transcription brillante (1865)
Op. 182 - Don Bucefalo', opéra-bouffe de Cagnoni, Fantaisie-transcription
Op. 183 - Marche arménienneOp. 184 - Chanson mauresque de 'La fiancée d’Abydos', opéra de Jules Adenis et Adrien Barthe, Transcription brillante de salon 
Op. 185 - La Proscrite, mélodie de Justin Bru, Transcription de salon
Op. 186 - Le Voyage en Chine, Fantaisie brillante
Op. 187 - Colinette à la cour, chœur de GrétryOp. 189 - Chansons espagnoles, Fantaisie de concert
Op. 190 - Nocturne-mazurk sur un motif du ballet de 'la Fidenzata Valacca' de Max. Graziani et R. MattiozziOp. 191 - Don Juan, opéra de Mozart, Fantaisie pour piano
Op. 192 - La Rentrée au camp, Caprice-marche
Op. 194 - La VioletteOp. 195 - Valse des féesOp. 196 - Toast, Chanson à boire
Op. 197 - Rêve perdu, Ballade
Op. 198 - Chanson mauresqueOp. 199 - Sémiramis, opéra de Rossini, Souvenirs mélodiques
Op. 200 - L'Elisir d'amore, opéra de Donizetti, souvenirs mélodiques pour piano 
Op. 201 - José-María, opéra-comique de , Fantaisie pour piano
Op. 202 - Si vous n'avez rien à me dire, romance de Willy de Rothschild
Op. 203 - Caprice fantaisie sur 'Zilda', opéra comique de F. de FlotowOp. 204 - Marche SolennelleOp. 205 - Sous les lilasOp. 206 - Freyschutz, opéra de Weber, Souvenirs mélodiques
Op. 207 - Non è ver (Ce n'est pas vrai), romanza de Tito Mattei, transcrite et variée
Op. 208 - Non tornó! (Il ne vient plus!), romanza de Tito Mattei, transcrite et variée
Op. 209 - Mignon, opéra d'Ambroise Thomas, Fantaisie brillante
Op. 210 - Le Désert, de Félicien David, fantaisie brillante
Op. 211 - Orphée aux enfers de J. Offenbach, Fantaisie brillante
Op. 213 - Don Carlos, grand opéra de Verdi, Fantaisie brillante
Op. 214 - Fantaisie de salon sur 'La Grande-Duchesse de Gérolstein
Op. 216 - Romeo et Juliette, opéra de Ch. Gounod, Fantaisie de salon
Op. 217 - Sardanapale, opéra de Victorin Joncières, Souvenirs mélodiques 
Op. 218 - L'Oie du Caire (L'oca del Cairo), opéra-bouffe, Fantaisie
Op. 219 - Idylle
Op. 220 - Défilé-marche (de Kaschte), transcription militaire
Op. 222 - Carlotta-polka
Op. 223 - Fantaisie brillante sur 'Robinson Crusoé' de J. Offenbach 
Op. 225 - Giovanna d'Arco, opéra de Verdi, fantaisie brillante
Op. 226 - Romance de 'la lettre des Porcherons', de Grisar, Transcription de salon
Op. 227 - Le Médecin malgré lui, opéra de Ch. Gounod, Fantaisie brillante
Op. 228 - Le Premier jour de bonheur, opéra en 3 actes d'Auber, romance, chanson-gigue variés
Op. 229 - Le Premier jour de bonheur, opéra-comique d'Auber: Les Djinns, mélodie transcrite
Op. 230 - Hamlet, musique de Ambroise Thomas, Fantaisie brillante
Op. 231 - La Fête du printemps, fantaisie-ballet sur Hamlet (Thomas), opéra d'Ambroise Thomas
Op. 232 - Romance et Duo des Hirondelles sur Mignon, de Thomas, Fantaisie
Op. 233 - Galop de salon de 'Fleur-de-Thé', opéra bouffe de Ch. Lecocq
Op. 234 - Fantaisie brillante sur 'Les Dragons de Villars', opéra-comique de Maillart
Op. 229 - Chanson des Djinns, mélodie transcrite (on Le Premier jour de bonheur by Auber)
Op. 235 - Richard Cœur-de-Lion, opéra de Grétry, Souvenirs mélodiques 
Op. 236 - Le Crociato, opéra de Meyerbeer (Souvenirs mélodiques, No. 22)
Op. 237 - Beatrice di Tenda, opéra de Bellini (Souvenirs mélodiques, No. 23)
Op. 238 - Sérénade de J.B. Wekerlin, transcrite et variée
Op. 239 - Le Chant du régiment, fantaisie militaire sur un chœur de Gevaert
Op. 240 - Guillaume Tell de Rossini, Fantaisie brillante
Op. 241 - Un ballo in maschera, opéra de Verdi, Fantaisie brillante
Op. 242 - Bellone, Caprice militaire
Op. 243 - Vieille chanson du jeune temps, mélodie de J. O'Kelly, transcrite et variée
Op. 245 - Bluette
Op. 246 - Danse bohémienne
Op. 247 - Carillon-mazurka
Op. 248 - La Passariello
Op. 249 - Viens au bord de la mer, mélodie de Ch. Jacques, transcrite et variée
Op. 250 - Fantaisie de salon sur La Périchole, opéra-Bouffe de J. Offenbach
Op. 251 - Grande fantaisie brillante sur 'Les Huguenots', opéra de Meyerbeer
Op. 254 - Succès-polka
Op. 255 - La Contessina, opéra de Józef Michał Poniatowski, Romanza
Op. 259 - Fantaisie brillante sur Vert-Vert, opéra-comique de J. Offenbach
Op. 260 - Messe solennelle Petite messe solennelle, de G. Rossini
Op. 261 - Grande fantaisie brillante sur Le Prophète, opéra de Meyerbeer
Op. 263 - Allégresse, Allegro-scherzando
Op. 264 - La Petite Fadette, de Th. Semet, Pastorale
Op. 267 - Le Chant du berceau
Op. 268 - Les Clochettes d'or
Op. 270 - Vienne
Op. 273 - Havanaise, mélodie de d'E. Paladilhe, Transcription pour le piano
Op. 274 - Bouquet de bal
Op. 275 - Au printemps, Mélodie, transcrite et variée
Op. 276 - La Princesse de Trébizonde, fantaisie élégante pour le piano sur l'opéra-bouffe de J. Offenbach
Op. 279 - Les Brigands, de J. Offenbach, Fantaisie brillante
Op. 280 - Mandolinata, Fantaisie quasi-capriccio sur la mélodie de Paladilhe
Op. 280 - Mia Nera! Sous les palmiers de Bordighiere, Mélodie
Op. 281 - La Bohémienne, de Balfe, Romance du rêve
Op. 282 - Fantaisie brillante sur 'La Bohémienne', de M. W. Balfe
Op. 283 - Envoi de fleurs, mélodie de Gounod (transcription)
Op. 285 - Valse brillante sur 'CoppeliaOp. 286 - Fantaisie brillante sur 'L'Ombre', opéra-comique de F. de Flotow 
Op. 287 - La Marseillaise, de Rouget de Lisle, Paraphrase brillante
 Flick et Flock, Galop du ballet de Hertel (1864)
 Sorrente, mazurka de salon sur une mélodie de J. J. Masset, (1864)

Songs
 La Fleur des champs, Villanelle (words by Xavier Forneret), 1854
 Sérénade, Poésie et musique d'Anatole Lionnet (accompaniment by Ketterer), 1867

Chamber works
 (with Adolphe Herman, 1823-1903) Duo for violin and piano after Aimé Maillart's 'Lara' (Herman's Op. 71)
 (with Adolphe Herman) Op. 80 – Grand duo brillant sur 'Le Pardon de Ploërmel', opéra de G. Meyerbeer, for violin and piano
 (with Vincenzo Sighicelli) Op. 105 – Fantaisie espagnole, for violin and piano
 (with Auguste Durand) Op. 143 – La Favorite [de Donizetti]. Fantaisie de concert, for piano and organ
 Op. 165 - Grande fantaisie de concert sur Le Songe d'une nuit d’été de Mendelssohn-Bartholdy, for two pianos
 (with Auguste Durand) Op. 175 – L'Africaine', opéra de Meyerbeer, Duo brillant, for piano and organ
 (with Auguste Durand) Op. 188 – Trio on themes from 'La traviata', for violin, piano, and organ
 Don Carlos, Grand opéra de Verdi, Duo concertant pour piano et violon composé par E. Ketterer et A. Vizentini, 1867 
 Les Opéras célèbres. Duos concertants sur les Opéras de Verdi composés pour Piano et Violon par E. Ketterer et Ad. (Adolphe) Herman (1868–69) :) Rigoletto ; Il trovatore ; La Traviata ; Un ballo in maschera ; Simon Boccanegra ; Ernani ; I Lombardi alla prima crociata ; I due Foscari ; Luisa Miller ; I Masnadieri ; Attila (opera) ; Aroldo.
 (with Adolphe Herman) 12 Duos concertants sur les chefs d'œuvre lyriques des grands maîtres (1863–1866), for violin and piano: 1. Cosi fan tutte (Herman's Op. 56) (1863); 2. Oberon (Herman's Op. 57) (1863); 3. Don Juan; 4. Otello; 5. Moïse (de Rossini) (Herman's Op. 68) (1864); 6. Norma, de Bellini (Herman's Op. 64) (1864); 7. Les Noces de Figaro; 8. Robin des Bois (de Weber) (Herman's Op. 70) (1864); 9. Le Barbier de Séville (de Rossini) (Herman's Op. 80); 10. L'Elisir d'amore (Herman's Op. 81) (1866); 11. Les Puritains, de Bellini (Herman's Op. 82) (1866); 12. Richard Cœur de Lion, de Grétry (Herman's Op. 83) (1866).

Posthumous works
 La Favorite, de Donizetti, Fantaisie (1874)
 Bohêma, Caprice de concert (1875 or before)
 Diadème-polka (1875 or before; also arranged for piano 4-hands)
 Eole, Mazurka de salon (1875 or before)
 Moldoa, Caprice russe (1875 or before)
 Le Postillon, Galop (1876 or before)

References

External links

1831 births
1870 deaths
19th-century classical composers
19th-century French composers
19th-century French male classical pianists
Composers for piano
French male composers
French Romantic composers
Musicians from Rouen
Pupils of Antoine François Marmontel